Reinhardt Arndt (born 4 June 1952) is a German judoka. He competed in the men's extra-lightweight event at the 1980 Summer Olympics.

References

External links
 

1952 births
Living people
German male judoka
Olympic judoka of East Germany
Judoka at the 1980 Summer Olympics
Sportspeople from Berlin
20th-century German people